Mürren is a railway station and terminus of the Bergbahn Lauterbrunnen-Mürren, a hybrid cable car and rail link that connects it with the village of Lauterbrunnen in the Bernese Oberland region of Switzerland. It takes its name from the resort village of Mürren in which it is situated.

The station has two passenger tracks within the lower level of a two-level station building, with a street entrance at the upper level. The Lauterbrunnen-Mürren line also handles goods traffic to and from Mürren, and a freight depot is situated to the north of the passenger station.

The station is served by the following passenger trains:

The passenger car for this line has been restored, and is now on display in the upper level of the station.

References

External links 
 
 Mürren station page on the Jungfraubahnen web site

Railway stations in the canton of Bern